Camponotus coriolanus is a species of carpenter ant (genus Camponotus) found in Brazil.

References

coriolanus
Hymenoptera of South America
Insects described in 1912